Missionary Sisters of the Holy Rosary (MSHR) is a Roman Catholic apostolic congregation of women religious founded by Bishop Joseph Shanahan CSSp (Irish born bishop in Nigeria) on 7 March 1924, in Killeshandra, County Cavan, Ireland. They are sometimes referred to as the Killeshandra Nuns. The order received canonical recognition by Pope John XXIII in 1938.? Its initial mission was to Nigeria in 1928, but over the years it grew to mission in other countries in Africa, developing schools and medical facilities.

In 1954, the Holy Rosary Sisters took charge of the clinic at Serabu, Sierra Leone from the Sisters of St. Joseph of Cluny. In 1965 the order opened their second hospital at Panguma, in the Eastern Province of Sierra Leone which they administered until 1986.

Due to the civil war the order had to leave Sierra Leone in 1994, as a result the sisters moved to Gambia where refugees from the conflict had fled.

During the Nigerian Civil War (1967-1970), the sisters still ministered the people in the breakaway area of Biafra, and were involved in the relief services to those affected by the war, following the end of the war, foreign missionaries were expelled from southern Nigeria, at this time local Missionary Sisters took over the running of the schools, and medical facilities set up by the order.

It opened its US mission in Pennsylvania in 1951, and in Sao Paulo, Brazil in 1966. In 1992 a mission in Mexico started.

The original convent of the Holy Rosary in Killeshandra bought by the sisters in 1924 formerly Drummully House. With the drop in vocations in Ireland, they developed a retreat and conference centre in 1976, and eventually closed the house in 1985. A new building was opened in Cavan Town and in Dublin in 1985, in 2012 the old convent which had become derelict and had been vandalised was demolished. In 1991 the order participated with many other religious organisations in the establishment of the Kimmage Mission Institute (1991-2006) to combine their training efforts.

The order now has novitiates in Cameroon, Nigeria, and Kenya.

Over the years in Africa they set up over 200 elementary schools, 40 secondary schools and 32 hospitals.

The Friends of the Killeshandra Nuns is an organisation which fundraises to provide for retiring nuns returning to Ireland, its patron is Sabina Higgins (wife of the Irish president) who has two cousins members of the order. In 2014 with the help from fundraisers, the order opened a retirement home in Artane, Dublin, Ireland, for its missionary sisters, it was officially opened by former Taoiseach John Bruton whose first cousin is a member of the order.

Notable Sisters
 Hillary Lyons - physician, paediatrician, surgeon, and obstetrician
 Lucy O'Brien - physician and obstetrician
 Mona Tyndall - obstetrician and gynaecologist

External Links
Missionary Sisters of the Holy Rosary - Official Website
Missionary Sisters of the Holy Rosary - YouTube Channel
Missionary Sisters of the Holy Rosary - Facebook Page

References

Catholic nursing orders
Catholic female orders and societies
Christian organizations established in 1924
Catholic missionary orders
Catholic religious institutes established in the 20th century